This article presents a list of the historical events and publications of Australian literature during 1867.

Books 

 Charles de Boos – Fifty Years Ago : An Australian Tale
 Maud Jeanne Franc – Golden Gifts : An Australian Tale
 Catherine Helen Spence – The Author's Daughter

Short stories 

 Mary Fortune
 "The Illumined Grave"
 "The White Maniac : A Doctor's Tale"
 Henry Kingsley – "The Two Cadets"

Poetry 

 Adam Lindsay Gordon
 Ashtaroth : A Dramatic Lyric
 Sea Spray and Smoke Drift
 Charles Harpur – "Obituary Lines"
 Henry Kendall
 "Bell-Birds"
 "Coogee"
 "Illa Creek"
 "The Warrigal"
 Clarinda Parkes – Poems

Births 

A list, ordered by date of birth (and, if the date is either unspecified or repeated, ordered alphabetically by surname) of births in 1867 of Australian literary figures, authors of written works or literature-related individuals follows, including year of death.

 24 February – Jennings Carmichael, poet (died 1904)
 17 June – Henry Lawson, poet and short story writer (died 1922)
 11 August – Lilian Turner, novelist (died 1956)
 13 October – Guy Boothby, novelist (died 1905)
 26 November – Roderic Quinn, poet and short story writer (died 1949)

Deaths 

A list, ordered by date of death (and, if the date is either unspecified or repeated, ordered alphabetically by surname) of deaths in 1867 of Australian literary figures, authors of written works or literature-related individuals follows, including year of birth.

Unknown date
 Charlotte Barton, author of Australia's earliest known children's book (born 1797)

See also 
 1867 in Australia
 1867 in literature
1867 in poetry
 List of years in Australian literature
List of years in literature

References

 
Australia
19th-century Australian literature
Australian literature by year